GF, gf or gF may refer to:

Arts and entertainment
 GuitarFreaks, a music video game series
 Ground Floor, an American comedy series created by Bill Lawrence and Greg Malins
 Gravity Falls, a Disney TV show

Businesses and organizations

Airlines
French Guiana (ISO 3166 country code: GF)
Gulf Air (IATA airline designator: GF)
Sierra Leone (ICAO airport designator prefix: GF)

Other businesses and organizations
 Game Freak, a game developer
 Georg Fischer, abbreviated +GF+
 GlobalFoundries, a semiconductor foundry headquartered in Santa Clara, California
 Grafiska Fackförbundet - Mediafacket, the Swedish Graphic Workers' Union

Math, science, and technology
 Cyclosarin nerve gas (NATO designation: GF)
 Fermi's constant, GF
 Fluid intelligence as opposed to gC, crystallized intelligence
 Galois field, in mathematics
 Generating function, in mathematics
 GF method, Wilson's normal mode analysis
 Gram force (symbol: gf)
 Grammatical Framework, a type-theoretic grammar formalism
 Greater fool theory, in economics
 Growth factor, in biology
 Glass Fibre, in Plastic material identification

Other uses
 Goals for, a statistic in ice hockey and other sports
 Girlfriend 
 Gluten free, denoting foods free from the protein gluten
 Good faith, a sincere intention
 Good Friday, a Christian holiday
 Godfather, a male godparent
 Dominical letter GF, for a leap year starting on Monday
 Good fight, what is generally said after a fight in a Massively multiplayer online game
 A first generation Subaru Impreza station wagon (ID code: GF)